Countryman means:
1. an inhabitant, especially a native, of a country in the sense of a nation, or,
2. a person living in the countryside or rural area, and often working in the trades typical of rural areas 

Countryman may also refer to:

Countryman (surname)
Operation Countryman an investigation into police corruption in the Greater London area.
Countryman (film), a motion picture set in Jamaica
Countryman (album), an album by Willie Nelson
Countryman (newspaper), a rural-themed newspaper in Western Australia
Countryman (magazine), a British magazine
Countryman (DJ Skitz album), an album by DJ Skitz
Countryman, a brand of microphones
Mini Countryman, a car